Eonia (Euro Overnight Index Average) is computed as a weighted average of all overnight unsecured lending transactions in the interbank market, undertaken in the European Union and European Free Trade Association (EFTA) countries by the Panel Banks. It is reported on an ACT/360 day count convention and is displayed to three decimal places. "Overnight" means from one TARGET day (i.e. day on which the Trans-European Automated Real-time Gross Settlement Express Transfer system is open) to the next. The panel of reporting banks is the same as for Euribor, and a list is provided by the overseers of the publication of the index. There is no clear definition of 'interbank market' leading to the potential of subjective assessment of what is an 'interbank loan', albeit all panel banks are subject to the Eonia Code of Conduct.

Eonia reference rates are calculated by the European Central Bank, based on all overnight interbank assets created before the close of RTGS systems at 6pm CET, and published through GRSS (Global Rate Set Systems) every day before 7pm CET. It can be found under the ISIN identifier EU0009659945.

Going forward, eonia will gradually be replaced by the Euro short-term rate (€STR). The ECB has published €STR from 2nd of October 2019.

See also
EURONIA
European Banking Federation
Federal funds rate
Interbank lending market
TONAR
SARON
SONIA
List of acronyms: European sovereign-debt crisis

References

External links
Eonia homepage
Eonia historical data (informative)
Eonia-Swap homepage
Eonia-Swap historical data (informative)
European Central Bank
Euribor homepage
Eonia historical data in Excel files (informative)
Eonia graphs and charts
Historical chart

Eurozone
Banking
Interest rates